Outrage porn (also called outrage discourse, outrage media and outrage journalism) is any type of media or narrative that is designed to use outrage to provoke strong emotional reactions for the purpose of expanding audiences, whether traditional television, radio, or print media, or in social media with increased web traffic and online attention. The term outrage porn was coined in 2009 by political cartoonist and essayist Tim Kreider of The New York Times.

Overview
The use of the term was first attributed to Tim Kreider in a New York Times article in July 2009, where Kreider said: "It sometimes seems as if most of the news consists of outrage porn, selected specifically to pander to our impulses to judge and punish and get us all riled up with righteous indignation". Kreider made a distinction between authentic outrage and outrage porn by stating, "I'm not saying that all outrage is inherently irrational, that we should all just calm down, that It's All Good. All is not good...Outrage is healthy to the extent that it causes us to act against injustice". Kreider is also noted as saying: "It spares us the impotent pain of empathy, and the harder, messier work of understanding".

The term has also been frequently used by Observer media critic, Ryan Holiday. In his 2012 book Trust Me, I'm Lying, Holiday described outrage porn as a "better term" for a "manufactured online controversy" to describe the fact that "People like getting pissed off almost as much as they like actual porn".

In general use, outrage porn is a term used to explain media that is created not in order to generate sympathy, but rather to cause anger or outrage among its consumers. It is characterized by insincere rage, umbrage and indignation without personal accountability or commitment. Media outlets are often incentivized to feign outrage because it specifically triggers many of the most lucrative online behaviors, including leaving comments, repeat pageviews and social sharing, which the outlets capitalize on. Salon, Gawker, and affiliated websites Valleywag and Jezebel have been noted for abusing the tactic. Traditional media outlets, including television news and talk radio outlets have also been characterised as being engaged in outrage media.

Research

In 2014, Jonah Berger, a professor of marketing at the Wharton School of the University of Pennsylvania conducted a study on the spreadability of emotions via social media and concluded that "Anger is a high-arousal emotion, which drives people to take action...It makes you feel fired up, which makes you more likely to pass things on". Additionally, online audiences may be susceptible to outrage porn in part because of their feeling of powerlessness to managers, politicians, creditors, and celebrities.

In 2014, Tufts University professors Jeffrey Berry and Sarah Sobieraj in their book The Outrage Industry characterised outrage media as being a genre as well as a discursive style of media, which attempts to provoke emotional responses (e.g., anger, fear, moral indignation) through the use of overgeneralisation, sensationalism, and misleading or false information ad hominem attacks, and belittling ridicule of opponents. They also characterised it as being personality-centered, focusing on a particular media professional, and as being reactive, responding to already-reported news rather than breaking stories of its own. In their 2009 study of political media in the United States, they found outrage journalism to be widespread, with 90 percent of all content analyzed including at least one example of it; and that "the aggregate audience for outrage media is immense".

Brain chemistry
Tobin Smith, a 14 year veteran commentator at Fox News explains the production tactics used and physiological basis for why the outrage narrative is so effective at building and retaining substantial audiences.  Typically during an opinion show, the first step is that the viewer will see a "Fox News Alert" or teaser "cold open sequence portraying some tribal heresy or threat from an out-group.  The tactic of using the Alert or cold-open serves to blur what is news versus what is opinion/ commentary.  In the viewer's mind, the amygdala assesses danger and prepares the body for a fight or flight event and releases a boost of adrenaline, cortisol, and epinephrine. In the second step, the Fox producer runs a video of some noted liberal celebrity, politician or commentator "impugning, insulting, or mocking the viewer's right wing tribal belief system." The third stage is that the viewer enters "active tribal mode" and the "risk assessing amygdala silently shouts, 'Say it again and I'll punch you out!'"  In the fourth step, "the tribal enemy (aka libtard) stands his/her ground, repeating the pronouncement and tribal heresy with more authority.  Tobin Smith's view is that this is set up is similar to that of a WWE choreographed wrestling match, with the right wing host and guests stepping in the ring "rhetorically punching the tribal enemy in the nose for the viewer."  In the 6th and 7th stages, the adrenaline rush in response to the threat is replaced with a dose of dopamine (associated with regulating strength of motivation towards a particular goal). Smith's account is that this "sets the viewer into anticipation of another tribal victory." Finally, "with the thrill of victory triggered by the validation of tribal orthodoxy and feelings of continued safety, the viewer's brain now releases the good stuff-serotonin, the opiate like chemical.

Notable incidents
 2014 celebrity photo hack
 Ashley Madison data breach
 Christmas controversies "The War on Christmas," an almost annual event
 Jonah Lehrer controversy

See also

Notes

References

Bibliography
 
 
 
 
  (Page numbers cited correspond to the ePub edition.)

External links
 Kurtz, Howard (December 6, 2016). "Are anti-Trump pundits guilty of 'outrage porn'?", Media Buzz, Fox News (via YouTube).

Boycotts
Social concepts
Internet-based activism
Political concepts
Phrases
Political neologisms
Shunning
Social commentary
Social phenomena
Social rejection
Trumpism